Harry George Keenan (June 15, 1867, Richmond, Indiana – April 18, 1944, Santa Ana, California) was an early American silent film actor.

He starred in about 45 silent films mostly shot between 1912 and 1916, including The Highest Bid, with actresses such as Charlotte Burton.

Selected filmography
 The Winged Idol (1915)

External links

1867 births
1944 deaths
American male silent film actors
Male actors from Indiana
People from Richmond, Indiana
People from Santa Ana, California
20th-century American male actors